SMB College Group, formerly Brooksby Melton College and Stephenson College, is a further education college based in Leicestershire.

Notable alumni
Owen Warner - actor
Tom Marshall - photo colouriser and model maker
Adrian Scarborough - actor and patron of the college 
Amy Wren - actress
George Martin - rugby union player
Will Wand - rugby union player

External links
 College website

Further education colleges in Leicestershire
Melton Mowbray